FC Halifax Town is a professional association football club based in Halifax, West Yorkshire, England. They replaced Halifax Town A.F.C., which went into administration in the 2007–08 season.

History

Formation

Huge tax debts buried Halifax Town A.F.C. after almost 100 years as a football club. In May 2008, it was revealed that Halifax owed over £814,000 to Her Majesty's Revenue and Customs. It was originally thought the club owed the taxman around £500,000, which might have left scope for a deal. At a meeting of the FA, discussing the makeup of the football pyramid for the 2008–09 season, it was decided that FC Halifax Town would be placed in the Northern Premier League Division One North (the eighth tier of English football) despite various appeals.

Northern Premier League (2008–2011)
The club's first game under the new name FC Halifax Town was a friendly defeat against Tamworth on 19 July 2008. The Shaymen's first competitive match came in a 3–0 loss to Bamber Bridge. FC Halifax's first ever season was filled with inconsistency: ending outside the play-off positions in 8th place.

In April 2009, Neil Aspin was appointed as the new manager, which would prove to be an excellent appointment. His first season in charge was a successful one; winning the league with 100 points (scoring 108 goals in the process). Halifax reached the FA Cup 4th qualifying round that season: eventually losing to Wrexham in front of a record crowd of 2,843. The title was sealed with a 2–2 home draw against Clitheroe.

Halifax started the 2010–11 season in the Northern Premier League, (the 7th tier of English football). New-signing Jamie Vardy (who would later play for Leicester City and the England National Team) helped fire Halifax to back-to-back promotions to the Conference North as top scorer with 22 goals. Once again, Halifax would lose in the fourth qualifying round of the FA Cup to a fifth tier side; this time it would be a narrow defeat to Mansfield Town. On New Year's Day 2011, Town beat FC United of Manchester 4–1 at the Shay which attracted a crowd of 4,023, an attendance that at the time held the record crowd for the Northern Premier League. They finally won the title after winning 2–0 at Retford United and gained automatic promotion to the Conference North.

Conference North years (2011–2013)
During pre-season, star-striker Jamie Vardy signed for Fleetwood Town. Vardy was replaced as Halifax's main striker by Lee Gregory (who would later play for Millwall and Stoke City in the Championship). Halifax had a sluggish start to their first ever season in the 6th tier. For the first ever time, Halifax reached the 1st round of the FA Cup: a televised home tie against League 1 leaders Charlton Athletic. The result was a 4–0 defeat in front of 4,601 supporters.The club rose from 13th at the start of the match to 3rd by the end of the season. Halifax lost in the play-offs to Gainsborough Trinity (3–2 on aggregate).

The 2012–13 season was the club's second consecutive season in the 6th tier. The season was defined by successful cup-runs and another promotion. In the FA Cup, Halifax took Conference Premier side Lincoln City to a replay in the 4th qualifying round. In the FA Trophy Halifax reached the quarter-finals of the tournament, eventually losing out to 5th tier side Dartford. Due to Town's cup-runs and postponements from poor weather caused a huge back-log in fixtures. By February, Halifax had ten games in hand on certain teams. Halifax had a difficult run at the end of the season (despite playing 12 games in 27 days), reaching the play-offs in 5th. In the play-off semi-final, Halifax won 3–1 (on aggregate) against local side Guiseley. The play-off final was won 1–0 against Brackley Town with a solitary goal by Lee Gregory.

National League years (2013–)
The National League (5th tier) was the highest level that the newly formed FC Halifax Town side had played at since formation. Neil Aspin started the 2013–14 season by signing a two-year contract. Their first season in the 5th tier started with a disappointing 5–1 defeat to Cambridge United. Town's first win in the 5th tier was against Wrexham. From March onwards, the Shaymen won 9 of 10 matches (keeping 7 clean-sheets) Halifax finished their first season in the Conference play-off positions (the highest placed semi-professional team in the country). Halifax lost 2–1 to Cambridge United in the play-off semi-final, rounding off a sensational first season in the 5th tier.

During pre-season, Lee Gregory was sold for £250,000 to Millwall after being Halifax's top scorer for three consecutive seasons (scoring 18, 20 and 29 goals respectively). Halifax started the new season with five consecutive wins, placing the Shaymen at the top of the league. In the 1st round of the FA Cup, Halifax were drawn against old rivals Bradford City. The televised match attracted 8,042 spectators (FC Halifax Town's record attendance): which Town lost 2–1. Eventually, form dropped off in the league with too many draws (15), leaving Halifax Town in 9th place at the end of the season.

The Shaymen's third season in the National League was a poor one, culminating in relegation back to the 6th tier. Neil Aspin was sacked and replaced by Darren Kelly. Kelly oversaw disastrous results against Grimsby Town (7–0), Cheltenham Town (7–1) and Braintree Town (6–3). The Braintree defeat forced the hand of the board who sacked him after less than two months in charge. Jim Harvey became caretaker manager, he turned the club's fortunes around but couldn't prevent Halifax's relegation back to the National League North following a draw against Macclesfield Town. Meanwhile, Halifax reached the 2016 FA Trophy Final, defeating Grimsby Town 1–0 at Wembley Stadium.

Harvey was replaced by North Ferriby United manager Billy Heath. Town made an immediate return to the National League, finishing in 3rd place. Halifax met Salford City in the play-off semi-final, drawing 1–1 (winning 3–0 on penalties). In the play-off final, Halifax beat Chorley 2–1 after extra time in front of nearly 8000 fans.

Halifax's return to the National League was largely uneventful. Despite mid-season doubts, Halifax were never in serious danger of relegation. Billy Heath was replaced by Jamie Fullarton mid-season who guided them to 16th place. For the second consecutive season, Halifax finished the season in 16th place. Halifax were top of the league at the end of August having just switched to a hybrid full-time model. The highlight of the season was an impressive win against League Two side Morecambe.

During pre-season, Jamie Fullarton was replaced with Pete Wild. This time though, the positive start to the season didn't end like in previous seasons. By March, the COVID-19 forced the cancellation of the season. The final league position was decided on a points per game decision, meaning Halifax would end up in the play-off positions. However, the Shaymen lost 2–1 in the play-offs to Boreham Wood. Halifax finished the following season in 10th place - four points outside the play-offs. Due to the ongoing coronavirus pandemic, the vast majority of fixtures were played behind closed doors during 2020–21.

Kit

Halifax Town's traditional colours are blue and white. The club doesn't have any particular, identifiable style and as such there can be quite a change of style season upon season. For the majority of Halifax Town's existence the club has opted for blue shirts, blue shorts and blue socks with various different styles on the shirt. This rhythm was interrupted between 2011 and 2014 as in the 2011–12 season the kit was blue with black trim as opposed to white, between 2012 and 2014 the club wore blue shirts, white shorts and blue sock; in the 2019-20 season the kit was blue with golden trim before moving back to a blue kit with white trimmings for 2020-21, which continued into 2021-22. As Halifax Town (AFC) the kit was also variable, including full blue, blue with white shorts, blue and white stripes and in the 1970s the kit included orange and even full white kits with orange Away kits have no set standard or style nor colour and can come in a wide range of styles, such as the 2019-20 away kit which was orange with light blue trim which was exchanged for a pink and black kit or a gold and white shirt with hints of burgundy with burgundy socks and shorts in 2020-21, even the 1996-1997 white away kit with purple trimmings or, finally, the black and white 2011-12 away kit with lime trimmings.

Rivals and local games

According to a survey conducted in 2003, Halifax's three main rivals are Burnley, Rochdale and Huddersfield Town. The rivalry with Burnley began in the 1980s when Burnley dropped into the Fourth Division and a number of intense affairs between the two clubs when the teams played sparked a rivalry. Despite not having met since and rarely beforehand, Halifax fans still view Burnley as being the club's biggest rival and make reference to it in several chants. Halifax have met Rochdale well over 100 times in the Football League and like the Burnley rivalry has formed due to the Yorkshire-Lancashire connection and being one of the nearest towns to Halifax, albeit over the Pennines. Rochdale are the club's oldest traditional rival and many of the older generation of supporters still see them as the primary rival. The Huddersfield rivalry comes from the proximity between the two towns, being just 8 miles apart. Like Burnley, the two clubs have rarely met due to Huddersfield usually being in a higher division but the fans still see there as being a rivalry.

Other rivals include Bradford City and York City. Despite Bradford being a similar distance away from Halifax as Huddersfield is and having met each other far more times, isn't considered as fierce a rivalry. York, although around 35 miles away, have a competitive rivalry with Halifax, particularly as the two were the only Yorkshire representatives when playing in the Conference Premier in the mid-2000s. Barnsley and Oldham Athletic were both considered rivals in the past; neither have played Halifax in a league fixture since the 1970s.

When Halifax were demoted to the regional leagues some of the smaller local clubs tried to form competitive rivalries but none of them really took off. The biggest of these rivalries was arguably with Guiseley as the clubs met several times and during Halifax's time in the Conference North the two clubs were both pushing for the play-offs. The rivalry has since declined and has become more of a friendly one as several ex-Halifax players now play and manage there. A small rivalry formed with Chester during their season in the Conference North as the two clubs were the two big, ex-league clubs and had gone through an almost identical fate, having been liquidated and demoted three leagues. Smaller rivalries were also formed with Bradford Park Avenue and Harrogate Town.

Players

Current squad

Current staff
Club officials
Chairman: David Bosomworth
Directors: Bobby Ham, Stuart Peacock
Associate Directors: Pete Hemingway, Pete Stajic
Club secretary: Tony Allan
President: Robert Holmes
Vice-president: Geoff Cope & Lester
Honorary Vice-presidents: Kemp & Queenie

First team staff
Manager: Chris Millington
Assistant manager: Andy Cooper
Goalkeeping coach: Paul Oakes
Physiotherapist: Aaron Scholes
Doctor: Donald Young

Managerial history

All competitions except West Riding County Cup

Performance

League standings

FA Cup

FA Trophy

Honours
FC Halifax Town's honours include:

League
National League North (Tier 6)
Play-off winners (2): 2012–13, 2016–17
Northern Premier League Premier Division (Tier 7)
Champions (1): 2010–11
Northern Premier League Division One North (Tier 8)
Champions (1): 2009–10

Cups
FA Trophy:
Winners (1): 2015–16
West Riding County Cup:
Winners (1): 2012–13

Player records

Most league goals in a season – 29: Lee Gregory, (2013–14)
Most league goals in total – 89: Lee Gregory, (2010–2014)
Most goals in a season – 40: James Dean, (2009–10)
Most goals in total – 102: Lee Gregory, (2010–2014)
Most goals scored in a single game by one player – 4: Lee Gregory, v Gloucester City (15 September 2012), v Worcester City (2 March 2013)
Most league appearances – 250, Scott McManus (2011–2018)
Most appearances – 290, Scott McManus (2011–2018)
Fastest goal – 25 seconds, Jon Worthington, v Gloucester City (15 September 2012)
Oldest player – Nigel Jemson, aged 39 years and 258 days v Chorley (25 April 2009)
Youngest player – Andrew Villerman, aged 17 years and 179 days v Newcastle Blue Star (21 March 2009)
Oldest goalscorer – Nigel Jemson, aged 39 years and 251 days v Trafford (18 April 2009)
Youngest goalscorer – David Brooks, aged 18 years and 59 days v Aldershot Town (5 September 2015)

Most league appearances and goals

The following table shows players who have made 75 league appearances or more for the club (including substitutions) in descending order:

The following table shows players who have scored 15 league goals or more for the club (including penalties) in descending order:

Team records
As of 6 September 2020

Highest attendance – 8,042, v Bradford City, FA Cup 1st round, 9 November 2014
Highest league attendance – 4,023, v FC United of Manchester, Northern Premier League Premier Division, 1 January 2011
Lowest attendance – 295, v Retford United, Northern Premier League President's Cup, 16 December 2008
Lowest league attendance – 778, v Warrington Town, Northern Premier League Division One North, 16 September 2008
Highest average attendance – 2,141, 2019–20 season
Highest league win – 8–1, v Ossett Town, 18 January 2011. 7–0, v Hinckley United, 5 March 2013
Worst league defeat – 0–7, v Grimsby Town, 13 October 2015
Most goals in a game – 9, v Ossett Town, 18 January 2011, v Braintree Town, 14 November 2015, v Ossett Albion, 8 November 2016
Longest league unbeaten run – 19, 2 March 2010 – 24 August 2010
Most league games won in a row – 10, 18 September 2010 – 16 November 2011
Most league games without winning – 12, 3 April 2015 – 29 August 2015
Most league games lost in a row – 8, 11 April 2015 – 18 August 2015
Most league games drawn in a row – 6, 7 March 2015 – 24 March 2015
Most consecutive league clean sheets – 7, 15 March 2014 – 15 April 2014
Most clean sheets in a season – 18, 2009–10

Notes

References

External links

FC Halifax Town at GSA
ShaymenOnline.org (statistics archive)

 
Football clubs in England
Association football clubs established in 2008
Football clubs in West Yorkshire
2008 establishments in England
Sport in Halifax, West Yorkshire
Phoenix clubs (association football)
National League (English football) clubs